The Brilliance BS6, in China sold as Zhonghua Zunchi, and later as the Brilliance M1 is a mid-sizecar produced by Brilliance Auto in the People's Republic of China. It was originally developed by Italdesign Giugiaro and launched as the Brilliance Zhonghua in December 2000.

Safety
A few cars were imported to Belgium for a short period during 2006, but deliveries were suspended after a Euro NCAP crash test arranged by the ADAC (German Automobile Association): the car achieved only one of possible five stars, a result described as "catastrophic" and "disastrous". A second star was denied because on a side impact test, biometric limits were exceeded. Due to the severe deformation of the car, the likelihood of occupants surviving the crash was low. However, according to a wire report carried by Forbes.com, a heavily strengthened version of BS6 has been tested in Spain by Idiada Automotive Technologies SA. Unlike the test in Germany earlier, the Brilliance garnered a 3-star rating as it passed the test performed in accordance with Euro NCAP guidelines. This star rating is still well below that of their established competition. Brilliance is expected to improve the safety ratings of its cars further before its cars are imported into Europe.

European exports

The Brilliance BS6 had a starting purchase price of 18,000 EUR, similar in price to established competitors like the Ford Mondeo and Volkswagen Passat. Brilliance was planning to market the car in America, but its price would have been at least $25,000, slightly higher than the already established Toyota Camry. Efforts to sell the car in Europe stalled after importer HSO Motors filed for bankruptcy in November 2009, in part due to the high price of the cars. According to automotive data provider JATO Dynamics, combined European Union sales of the BS4 and BS6 were only 502 units from 2007 to 2009, with only 46 BS6's sold in the EU in 2009. Sales ended in early 2010, but nonetheless, Brilliance appears to be back again, this time as Shenhua Motors GmbH.

The BS6 was sold in Europe with a 2.0-litre Mitsubishi sourced engine, used in both Comfort and Deluxe derivatives. It is a Euro 4 standard engine producing 122 bhp and 217 g/km .

Gallery

References

External links

Official website
Car and Driver review
ADAC crash test results
Crash test video
bs6 in hindi

passion pro bs6

BS6
Cars of China
Mid-size cars
Sedans
Italdesign vehicles
2010s cars
Cars introduced in 2000
Cars discontinued in 2010